Major General William Sharp McNair (September 18, 1868 – April 6, 1936) was a U.S. Army general.  During World War I, he commanded the artillery unit of the First Infantry Division and later the 151st Field Artillery Brigade.

Early life
William Sharp McNair was born in September 18, 1868 in Tecumseh, Michigan. His father was also from Tecumseh and his mother from Bucyrus, Ohio. He entered the United States Military Academy and graduated number twenty-three of fifty-four in the class of 1890. He was commissioned in the Artillery Corps. His classmates there included Colden Ruggles, Fred W. Sladen, Frank M. Caldwell, Clint C. Hearn, Daniel W. Ketcham, Edgar Jadwin, Francis Marshall, Harry H. Bandholtz, Henry D. Todd Jr., William C. Davis, George G. Gatley, Herbert Deakyne and William J. Snow. All of these men would, like McNair himself, attain the rank of general officer.

Military career
In 1896, McNair graduated from the Artillery School. He served in the China Relief Expedition, the Philippine–American War, and the Moro Expedition of 1903, for which he received his first Silver Star Citation. In 1916 and 1917, he served as brigadier general with the New York National Guard.

In France, he commanded the artillery of the First Infantry Division, and he later commanded the 151st Field Artillery Brigade. He participated in the Meuse-Argonne and the Sedan battles. He served as Chief of Artillery, first Army, and received the Distinguished Service Medal and another Silver Star.

From 1920 to 1922, he was Chief of Staff of the Department of Panama. His rank of brigadier general was restored in 1930, and when he retired on September 30, 1932, he was a major general.

Personal life
On December 26, 1894, he married Louise Bestor Potts at Fort Barrancas, Florida and they had four children: Mary Louise McNair, Dorothy McNair, William Douglas McNair (USMA, class of 1918), and Norma B. McNair. In retirement, he lived in San Antonio, Texas. He was a Presbyterian. McNair died on April 6, 1936.

Awards 
He received the Army Distinguished Service Medal during World War I, with the medal's citation stating the following:

He received the Silver Star Citation for gallantry in action during the Philippine Insurrection, 1899 to 1902.

References

External links
 

1868 births
1936 deaths
Recipients of the Silver Star
People from Tecumseh, Michigan
Recipients of the Distinguished Service Medal (US Army)
American military personnel of the Philippine–American War
Burials at Fort Sam Houston National Cemetery
United States Military Academy alumni
United States Army generals
United States Army generals of World War I
Military personnel from Michigan